The Organic Trade Association (OTA) is a membership-based business association that focuses on the organic business community in North America.  OTA's mission is to promote ethical consumerism, promoting and protecting the growth of organic trade to benefit the environment, farmers, the public and the economy. OTA is a member of The International Federation of Organic Agricultural Movements (IFOAM) and The International Working Group on Global Organic Textile Standard.

At the time of its conception, the Organic Trade Association (OTA), formerly known as the Organic Foods Production Association of North America (OFPANM), was one of few certifiers for the organic food industry. The original goals of the organization included, creating a common standardized image of organic produce in the marketplace, create guidelines for organic foods, endorse and evaluate other certification programs, and lead the industry by example.

Their biggest goal of creating a universal definition of what organic standards looked like would become highly contentious amongst the grass roots farmers and big business leaders. One issue that was tabled by 1988 was whether equitable labor was integral to organic standards.

Creating a definition required synergy between science and consumer behaviors. As well as, cross examination of previous definitions that would form a baseline.

Lobbying
Since 1998, the OTA has extensively lobbied regulatory agencies. The OTA had a total of $316,150 in lobbying expenditures for 2013. In 2012, the OTA spent a total of $369,494 on lobbying expenditures. Between 1998 and 2014, the OTA invested over $1.5 million into lobbying. Agencies typically lobbied by the OTA include: U.S. Senate, U.S. House of Representatives, U.S. Department of Agriculture, Environmental Protection Agency, Office of Management and Budget, and the Food & Drug Administration.

Criticism
The OTA Rider attached to the Agriculture Appropriations Act, which the USDA approved, and passed before Congress in 2006, opened the door for non-organic, non-agricultural, and synthetic additives in food products bearing the "organic" label.

See also
Organic agriculture
Organic Certification
Organic Food
Organic Farming

References

External links
 Organic Trade Association web site

Organic farming organizations
Product certification
Sustainability organizations